Greatest Hits is a compilation album by rapper Scarface, released by Virgin Records US in 2002. Track 11 "Love & Friendship" was the only new track.

Reception
In 2010, Rhapsody called it one of the best "coke rap" albums of all time.

Swishahouse remix
There is also a Swishahouse Screwed & Chopped remix of the album by DJ Michael '5000' Watts.

Track listing
"Mr. Scarface" (From The Album Mr. Scarface Is Back)
"Money & the Power" (From The Album Mr. Scarface Is Back)
"Let Me Roll" (From The Album The World Is Yours)
"Southside" (From The Album The Untouchable)
"Mary Jane" (From The Album The Untouchable)
"Goin' Down" (From The Album The Diary)
"Smile" (featuring 2Pac & Johnny P.) (From The Album The Untouchable)
"Fuck Faces" (featuring Too $hort, Devin “The Dude” & Tela) (From The Album My Homies)
"Homies & Thugs (The Remix)" (featuring Master P., Doracell & 2Pac) (From The Album My Homies)
"Guess Who's Back" (featuring Jay-Z and Beanie Sigel) (From The Album The Fix)
"Love & Friendship" (Non-Album Single)
"Now I Feel Ya" (From The Album The World Is Yours)
"I See a Man Die" (From The Album The Diary)
"Hand of the Dead Body" (featuring Ice Cube and Devin “The Dude”) (From The Album The Diary)
"Look Me In My Eyes" (From The Album The Last of a Dying Breed) 
"Jesse James" (From The Album The Diary)
"Born Killer" (From The Album Mr. Scarface Is Back)
"A Minute to Pray" (From The Album Mr. Scarface Is Back)

References

Scarface (rapper) albums
2002 greatest hits albums
Gangsta rap compilation albums